Corporate Corridor is a weekly business program on Dawn News that discusses business issues with top executives representing the private, public and government enterprises of Pakistan.

Pakistani television series